Voces magicae (singular: vox magica, "magical names" or "magical words") are Ancient Roman magical words, written in either Ancient Greek or Latin.

Definition and use
They were compensable, pronounceable, but nonsensical words with alleged arcane origins which were used in spells, charms, and amulets to enhance their magical potency.

The voces magicae were related to the Greek Ephesia Grammata. They may include alternative names of gods or other unusual phrases which may have been intended as the secret, authoritative true name of certain gods. As an example: in the Greek Magical Papyri, the first spell of the first papyrus intended to summon a daimon assistant and included the phrase (in translation) "[This] is your authoritative name: ARBATH ARBAOTH BAKCHABRE".

See also
Magic in the Greco-Roman world
Magical formula

References

Ancient Greek religion
Ancient Roman religion
Greco-Roman
Religion in classical antiquity
Magic words